FMK-3 may refer to:

 FMK-3 mine
 FMK-3 submachine gun